The 1949 Kansas Jayhawks football team represented the University of Kansas in the Big Seven Conference during the 1949 college football season. In their second season under head coach Jules V. Sikes, the Jayhawks compiled a 5–5 record (2–4 against conference opponents), finished fifth in the Big Seven Conference, and outscored all opponents by a combined total of 259 to 183. They played their home games at Memorial Stadium in Lawrence, Kansas.

The team's statistical leaders included Bud French with 510 rushing yards and 66 points scored, and Dick Gilman with 885 passing yards. Forrest Griffith and Dick Tomlinson were the team captains.

Schedule

References

Kansas
Kansas Jayhawks football seasons
Kansas Jayhawks football